The Belgrade Armorial II is the name given to an armorial compiled between 1600 and 1620, as a copy of the  which is dated to  1590. It was bought by Russian historian Alexander Soloviev in 1936, and is today held at the Museum of Applied Art in Belgrade. It is among the oldest, and finest of the Illyrian Armorials. Its origin remain unknown.

See also

Illyrian Armorials

References

Sources

Rolls of arms
Illyrian movement
Serbian heraldry
Illuminated heraldic manuscripts
17th-century illuminated manuscripts